Charlie Hustle: The Blueprint of a Self-Made Millionaire is the 5th studio album by American rapper E-40, released November 9, 1999 (the same day as his cousin B-Legit's Hempin' Ain't Easy album) on Jive and Sick Wid It. The album features production by Ant Banks, Bosko, Battlecat, Clint "Payback" Sands, Rick Rock and Studio Ton. It peaked at #2 on the Top R&B/Hip-Hop Albums and #28 on the Billboard 200. Like his previous album this was also certified gold. The album features guest performances by fellow members of The Click: B-Legit, D-Shot and Suga-T, as well as Jayo Felony, C-Bo, Fat Joe, Celly Cel, Levitti, The Mossie, Lil Wayne, Birdman and Juvenile.

A music video was produced for the song "Big Ballin' with My Homies". A second music video was produced for, "Earl That's Yo' Life/L.I.Q." featuring Too Short, Otis & Shug.

The song "Ballaholic", which features uncredited vocals from Kaveo, would later be sampled in E-40's "I'm Laced", also featuring uncredited vocals from Cousin Fik, taken from his 2012 album The Block Brochure: Welcome to the Soil 2.

Track listing

Charts

References 

E-40 albums
1999 albums
Albums produced by Ant Banks
Albums produced by Battlecat (producer)
Albums produced by Rick Rock
Albums produced by Bosko
Albums produced by Studio Ton
Gangsta rap albums by American artists
Jive Records albums
Sick Wid It Records albums